Ramiro Gabriel González Hernández (born 21 November 1990) is an Argentine-Chilean professional footballer who plays as a defender for Colo-Colo.

Career
González made his youth career in both Boca Juniors and Atlético Rafaela. Later, he played for clubs in minor categories of Argentine football until he joined on loan from Juventud Unida to Unión Española at the Chilean Primera División on 2017 season.

On 2019, he joined Liga MX club León on a free transfer reaching the 2019 Clausura's final and playing at the 2020 CONCACAF Champions League. In June 2020, he was loaned to Atlético San Luis. He left León at the end of 2021.

In January 2022, González returned to Argentina, signing a deal with Talleres de Córdoba until the end of 2023. He ended his contract with Talleres to join Colo-Colo in June 2022, but it didn't take place due to an injury detected by the doctors. So, he joined Platense.

Personal life
Due to his grandparents are Chileans, he acquired the Chilean nationality by descent according to Chilean law - keeping the Argentine nationality - when joined Unión Española on 2017. So, he didn't hold a foreign place in the Chilean football.

Honours
León
 Leagues Cup: 2021

References

External links
 
 Ramiro González at AS
 Ramiro González at playmakerstats.com (English version of ceroacero.es)

1990 births
Living people
Footballers from Rosario, Santa Fe
Argentine footballers
Argentine expatriate footballers
Argentine sportspeople of Chilean descent
Association football defenders
Citizens of Chile through descent
Naturalized citizens of Chile
Chilean footballers
Atlético de Rafaela footballers
Club Atlético Alvarado players
Juventud Unida de Gualeguaychú players
Instituto footballers
Unión Española footballers
Club León footballers
Atlético San Luis footballers
Talleres de Córdoba footballers
Club Atlético Platense footballers
Colo-Colo footballers
Argentine Primera División players
Torneo Argentino A players
Torneo Federal A players
Primera Nacional players
Chilean Primera División players
Liga MX players
Argentine expatriate sportspeople in Chile
Expatriate footballers in Chile
Argentine expatriate sportspeople in Mexico
Chilean expatriate sportspeople in Mexico
Expatriate footballers in Mexico